Thavarige Baa Thangi is a 2002 Indian Kannada-language drama film directed by Om Sai Prakash and written by Ajay Kumar. The film cast includes Shiva Rajkumar, Anu Prabhakar, Radhika, Adarsh, Hema Choudhary and Komal Kumar among others. The film was produced by R. S. Gowda while the original score and soundtrack were composed by Hamsalekha.

The film released on 1 November 2002 to a phenomenal response at the box office, making it one of the highest-grossing films of the year. The plot revolves around the bonding between Shivanna and Laxmi, who became orphans after their parents death, and how Laxmi faces extreme torture from her husband's parents and in-laws and how her brother tries to save her. The film was later remade in Telugu as Puttintiki Ra Chelli (2004). The success of this film which deals with the brother-sister bonding made the director to repeat the same theme in most of his forthcoming films with Shiva Rajkumar like Anna Thangi (2005), Thavarina Siri (2006) and Devaru Kotta Thangi (2009).

Cast

 Shiva Rajkumar as Shivanna
 Anu Prabhakar as Gouri 
 Radhika as Lakshmi 
Adarsh as Akash 
 Hema Choudhary
 Komal Kumar as Nandeesha 
 Avinash
 Bhavya
 Doddanna
 Sadhu Kokila
 Sarika Raje Urs 
Tanuja 
Kavitha
Padma Vasanthi 
Pushpa Swamy 
Keerthi Raj 
Krishne Gowda 
M. S. Umesh 
Rama Murthy 
Anil Kumar 
Sridhar Raj 
Gandasi Nagaraj 
Vaijanath Biradar

Soundtrack
The music of the film was composed by and lyrics written by Hamsalekha.

Awards
 Karnataka State Film Award for Best Supporting Actor - Komal

References

2002 films
2000s Kannada-language films
Indian drama films
Kannada films remade in other languages
Films scored by Hamsalekha
Films directed by Sai Prakash
2002 drama films